Majeediyya School (Dhivehi: މަޖީދިއްޔާ ސުކޫލް ) is the first Maldivian government school, located in Malé, Maldives. It only accepted boys until the introduction of Primary Education in 2010, which allowed girls to attend the school as well. The English medium is followed throughout all subjects, with the exception of Dhivehi and Islam. It teaches at the secondary level.

History
Majeediyya school was founded in 1927 under the name Madharusathul Salahiyya. The school name was changed to Madhrasathul Saniyyathul Hukoomathul Mahaldheebiyya in 1928. The first principal of the school was Husain Salaahuddin. Mohamed Ameen Didi was Principal from 1946 to 1953 and it was during this time that the school was renamed "Madhrasathul Majeediyya". In 2010, with the introduction of primary schools, Majeediyya became open to female students as well.

There are two songs associated with the school.

Band

On 1 July 1965, the first Bandmaster of Majeedhiyya School, Lieutenant A.A.Samidon, began music theory class. He founded the Marching Band of Majeedhiyya School. In 1979 the band became a fully  functional brass band. Woodwind instruments were introduced in 1997.

Notable alumni
Majeedhiyya school has produced 6 out of 7 Presidents of the Maldives and various other well-known figures in the country. Some notable alumni include:

Presidents
Mohamed Amin Didi - 1st President of the Maldives from January 1, 1953 to August 21, 1953. The principal of Majeedhiyya School from 1946 to 1953. (Never attended Majeedhiyya School).
Ibrahim Nasir - 2nd President of the Maldives from 1968 to 1978. Prime Minister of the Maldives from 1957 to 1968. 
Maumoon Abdul Gayoom - 3rd President of the Maldives from 1978 to 2008. 
Mohamed Nasheed - 4th President of the Maldives from 2008 to 2012. First democratically elected president.
Mohamed Waheed Hassan Manik - 5th President of the Maldives from 2012 to 2013. 
Abdulla Yameen - 6th President of the Maldives from 2013 to 2018.
Ibrahim Mohamed Solih - 7th President of the Maldives since 2018.

Military

Major General (Rtd) Moosa Ali Jaleel - Former Chief of Defence Force of the Maldives from 2008 to 2012, who played an important role in the victory against terrorists attack on 3 November 1988.

Mohamed Nazim - Former Colonel and the Defence Minister of Maldives from 2012. As of 2017 Dec, he has been imprisoned for terrorism charges for 13 years.

Athletes
Ali Ashfaq - football player. Also the captain of the Maldives national football team.
Ibrahim Fazeel - football player in Maldives national football team

Educational institutions established in 1927
Schools in the Maldives
Malé
1927 establishments in the British Empire